Piperkent is a rural locality (a selo) in Shikhikentsky Selsoviet, Suleyman-Stalsky District, Republic of Dagestan, Russia. The population was 225 as of 2010.

Geography 
Piperkent is located 13 km south of Kasumkent (the district's administrative centre) by road. Saytarkent is the nearest rural locality.

References 

Rural localities in Suleyman-Stalsky District